is a Japanese voice actress and singer.

Biography
She auditioned for Broccoli. Her song "Shining Star Love Letter" was used for A Certain Magical Index: The Movie – The Miracle of Endymion.

Filmography

Anime

Video games

Drama CD 
 Shikisai-Train - Yuri Kaminuma, Megumi Kiryu, Kanade Sekina

Discography

Singles

Albums

Studio albums

Mini albums

References

Notes

Citations

External links
  
 

1988 births
21st-century Japanese actresses
21st-century Japanese singers
21st-century Japanese women singers
Japanese YouTubers
Japanese voice actresses
Japanese video game actresses
Japanese radio personalities
Living people
Music YouTubers
People from Tokyo
Singers from Tokyo
Voice actresses from Tokyo